Fairfax is a town in Osage County, Oklahoma, United States. The Osage Nation reservation is coterminous with the county. The population was 1,380 at the 2010 census, down 11.3 percent from the figure of 1,555 recorded in 2000. It is notable as the home of world-famous ballerinas Maria and Marjorie Tallchief.

History
When the Santa Fe Railway chose to go up Salt Creek valley and bypassed the village of Gray Horse (which continues to exist today as the home of one of the Osage tribe's three major historic bands) the present day town of Fairfax was created.  Local merchants, including Lew A. Wismeyer, moved buildings from Gray Horse and leased  acres for a townsite. Wismeyer rejected the name Coda proposed by the railroad and convinced them to call the depot Fairfax after a hotel he had stayed at in Washington, D.C. The Osage tribe retained title to the townsite until March 3, 1905, when Congress provided for the land to be sold at public auction, with the proceeds credited to the tribe. Fairfax had 470 residents at the time of statehood in 1907. Fairfax is also the site of the majority of the Osage Indian Murders that took place in the 1920s in Osage County, Oklahoma. The murders occurred because of the discovery of oil that was found on Osage Nation Reservation (Osage County). At least 24 Osages were murdered. The mastermind behind it all was William K. Hale. Author David Grann wrote Killers of the Flower Moon, a book about these murders and how they led to the creation of the FBI.

Geography
Fairfax is located at  (36.571386, -96.706259).

Climate

Demographics

As of the census of 2000, there were 1,555 people, 657 households, and 417 families residing in the town. There were 831 housing units at an average density of 1,040.6 per square mile (401.1/km2). The racial makeup of the town was 67.65% White, 1.35% African American, 24.12% Native American, 0.19% Asian, 0.45% from other races, and 6.24% from two or more races. Hispanic or Latino of any race were 1.48% of the population.

There were 657 households, out of which 30.3% had children under the age of 18 living with them, 43.4% were married couples living together, 15.8% had a female householder with no husband present, and 36.4% were non-families. 33.5% of all households were made up of individuals, and 17.8% had someone living alone who was 65 years of age or older. The average household size was 2.31 and the average family size was 2.92.

In the town, the population was spread out, with 27.6% under the age of 18, 7.0% from 18 to 24, 22.6% from 25 to 44, 21.0% from 45 to 64, and 21.8% who were 65 years of age or older. The median age was 40 years. For every 100 females, there were 83.8 males. For every 100 females age 18 and over, there were 78.2 males.

The median income for a household in the town was $21,652, and the median income for a family was $25,385. Males had a median income of $26,518 versus $21,250 for females. The per capita income for the town was $12,765. About 23.9% of families and 28.0% of the population were below the poverty line, including 38.8% of those under age 18 and 21.7% of those age 65 or over.

Economy
The town economy has relied on agriculture and oil production. The population of Fairfax reached a high of 2,327 at the 1940 census, but began to decline as the production of oil dropped in the area, and farm populations decreased with increased mechanization. It fell to 1,869 by 1970, briefly rose to 1,949 in 1980, dropped again to 1,555 in 2000 and yet again to 1,380 in 2010 .

Notable people
 Maria Tallchief, professional ballerina
 Marjorie Tallchief,  professional ballerina
 Larry Coker, high school and college football coach

References

External links
 Encyclopedia of Oklahoma History and Culture - Fairfax

Towns in Osage County, Oklahoma
Towns in Oklahoma
Populated places established in 1903
1903 establishments in Oklahoma Territory